Richard Warnecombe or Warmecombe (by 1494 – 1547), of Ivington, Lugwardine and Hereford was a Member of Parliament for Hereford in 1529 and 1542 and Mayor of Hereford in 1525–6 and 1540–1.

References

Year of birth uncertain
1547 deaths
English MPs 1529–1536
English MPs 1542–1544
Mayors of Hereford